Life's Circus (German: Manege) is a 1928 German silent drama film directed by Max Reichmann and starring Raimondo Van Riel, Ernst Van Duren and Kurt Gerron. It was shot at the Staaken Studios in Berlin. 
The film's sets were designed by Leopold Blonder. It was made by the German branch of First National Pictures and premiered at the Marmorhaus in Germany's capital city.

Cast
 Raimondo Van Riel as Gaston Flamingo  
Ernst Van Duren as Ralf Flamingo
 Kurt Gerron as Bela Garay  
 Lucie Höflich as Seine Frau  
 Mary Johnson as Eve Garay  
 Valerie Boothby as Frau im Nordexpress 
 Valy Arnheim as Der Stallmeister  
 Alexander Murski as Der Direktor

References

Bibliography
 Bock, Hans-Michael & Bergfelder, Tim. The Concise Cinegraph: Encyclopaedia of German Cinema. Berghahn Books, 2009.

External links

1928 films
Films of the Weimar Republic
German silent feature films
Films directed by Max Reichmann
1928 drama films
German drama films
Circus films
German black-and-white films
Silent drama films
Films shot at Staaken Studios
1920s German films